Diploschizia mexicana is a species of sedge moth in the genus Diploschizia. It was described by John B. Heppner. It is found in Mexico.

References

External links
 Diploschizia mexicana at Zipcodezoo.com

Glyphipterigidae